Edward John Jeremiah (November 4, 1905 – June 7, 1967) was an American professional ice hockey player who played 15 games in the National Hockey League for the New York Americans and Boston Bruins during the 1931–32 season. After his playing days Jeremiah became the head coach for Dartmouth College until his retirement in 1967.

Career

Player
Edward Jeremiah joined the Dartmouth Indians in 1926 after graduating from Hebron Academy, where he was also a baseball star. As was standard practice, Jeremiah sat out his freshman year before playing for a powerhouse squad that went 25–11–5 in his time on the ice. In 1930, Jeremiah played summer baseball with the Osterville town team in the Cape Cod Baseball League.

After graduating Jeremiah joined the New Haven Eagles of the Canadian-American Hockey League, a precursor to the American Hockey League, spending part of three seasons with the team. Over the course of the 1931–32 season, Jeremiah played for four separate teams: the Eagles, the Boston Cubs (another CAHL team), the New York Americans and the Boston Bruins. In his 15 combined games between the two NHL teams Jeremiah recorded only one assist. After 1933 Jeremiah bounced around between various minor league clubs before ending his playing days in 1935.

Coaching

Ice hockey
After coaching the Boston Olympics for a brief time, Jeremiah returned to his alma mater as head coach beginning in 1937. Taking over from Herbert Gill, Jeremiah continued Dartmouth's winning tradition by setting a then-school record 18 wins in his first campaign and posted winning records in his first ten years behind the bench. After leading the Indians to a 21–2 mark in 1941–42, Jeremiah took the next three seasons off to serve in World War II, returning to his job at Hanover after the conclusion of the war. In his absence (though he is sometimes still listed as head coach during the time), Dartmouth was undefeated for an NCAA record 46 consecutive games from 1942 to 1946 with the first 19 coming under his direction.

After resuming his head coaching duties, and continuing with Dartmouth's winning ways, the college hockey landscape began to change quickly. The NCAA instituted a tournament with the 1947–48 season and with a record of 20–3 that year Dartmouth was one of four team invited to participate. The Indians won their semifinal match against Colorado College at the 1948 NCAA Division I Men's Ice Hockey Tournament by an 8–4 score, but was unable to overcome Michigan in the championship game. All four teams returned the following year with Dartmouth avenging their loss by downing the Wolverines 4–2 in the 1949 semifinal, but were stymied once again in the title match, this time losing to Boston College 4–3.

After 1949, Dartmouth began a slow decline from its lofty perch, recording only four winning seasons over the next 12 years. Things didn't get much better after the Indians became a founding member of ECAC Hockey in 1961; except for the season he took off in 1963–64, Jeremiah recorded only one winning season before retiring in 1967, turning over the team to Abner Oakes. Despite the lack of success in the final 18 years as head coach, Jeremiah was voted the ACHA National coach-of-the-year twice, receiving the Spencer Penrose Award in 1951 and 1967. Three months after retiring cancer claimed Jeremiah at the age of 61. The disease didn't stop the accolades as the ACHA named its Division III Coach of the Year Award in his honor. Jeremiah was inducted into the US Hockey Hall of Fame in 1973 the New Hampshire Legends of Hockey in 2002 and named as the 2008 recipient of the Hobey Baker Legend of College Hockey Award among other honors.

Other sports
In addition to his ice hockey duties, Eddie Jeremiah also spent time as the head coach for both the freshman baseball and freshman football squads at Dartmouth, even spending a few years as the head coach for the upper-class baseball team (1947–1951).

Career statistics

Regular season and playoffs

Head coaching record

Source:

References

External links

1905 births
1967 deaths
American men's ice hockey right wingers
Boston Bruins players
Boston Cubs players
Boston Olympics players
Cape Cod Baseball League players (pre-modern era)
Cleveland Falcons players
Dartmouth Big Green baseball coaches
Dartmouth Big Green football coaches
Dartmouth Big Green men's ice hockey coaches
Dartmouth Big Green men's ice hockey players
Hyannis Harbor Hawks players
Ice hockey people from Worcester, Massachusetts
Lester Patrick Trophy recipients
New Haven Eagles players
New York Americans players
Philadelphia Arrows players
Ice hockey coaches from Massachusetts